Institutional and societal calendars of the Roman Rite of the Catholic Church are lists of saints' feast days and other liturgical celebrations, organized by calendar date, that apply to members of individual institutes of consecrated life and societies of apostolic life of pontifical right that worship according to the Roman Rite of the Latin Church. They are "particular calendars" that build off of the General Roman Calendar.

Institutes and societies

Augustinians
Includes the Discalced Augustinians and the Augustinian Recollects
 3 January: Saint Fulgentius of Ruspe
 4 January: Blessed Christine of the Holy Cross
 8 January: Blessed Ugolino da Gualdo Cattaneo
 13 January: Blessed Veronica of Milan
 18 January: Blessed Mattia Ciccarelli
 23 January: Blessed Inés de Benigánim
 29 January: Blessed Anthony of Amandola
 3 February: Blessed Stephen Bellesini
 6 February: Blessed Angelo da Furci
 7 February: Blessed Anselmo Polanco
 9 February: Blessed Anne Catherine Emmerich
 13 February: Blessed Agostina Camozzi
 15 February: Blessed Giulia della Rena
 16 February: Blessed Simon of Cascia
 12 March: Blessed Jerome of Recanati
 22 March: Blessed Hugh Zefferini
 5 April: Blessed Mariano de la Mata
 18 April: Blessed Andrew of Montereale
 20 April: Blessed Simon Rinalducci
 23 April: Blessed Elena Valentinis
 24 April: Conversion of Saint Augustine of Hippo
 26 April: Our Lady of Good Counsel
 8 May: Our Lady of Grace
 8 May: Blessed Catherine of Saint Augustine
 11 May: Blessed Gregorio Celli
 12 May: Blessed William Tirry
 13 May: Our Lady of Help (perhaps related to Our Lady of Perpetual Help)
 16 May: Saint Alypius of Thagaste and Saint Possidius
 18 May: Blessed William of Toulouse
 19 May: Blessed Clemente da Osimo and Blessed Agostino Novello
 22 May: Saint Rita of Cascia
 4 June: Blessed Giacomo da Viterbo
 12 June: Saint John of Sahagún
 20 June: Blessed Philip of Piacenza
 25 June: Blessed Peter James of Pesaro
 2 July: Blesseds Giovanni Becchetti and Pietro Becchetti
 17 July: Blessed Magdelene Albrici
 24 July: Blessed Anthony della Torre of l'Aquila
 27 July: Blessed Lucia Bufalari
 2 August: Blessed John of Rieti
 17 August: Saint Clare of Montefalco
 19 August: Saint Ezequiél Moreno y Díaz
 26 August: Augustinian Martyrs of Gafsa in Africa
 27 August: Saint Monica
 28 August: Saint Augustine of Hippo 
 4 September: Our Lady of Consolation
 6 September: Blessed Angelo da Foligno
 10 September: Saint Nicholas of Tolentino
 19 September: Saint Alonso de Orozco Mena
 28 September: Blessed Peter Zuñiga, Blessed 金鍔次兵衛 (Thomas Kintsuba Jihyoe of Saint Augustine), and other Augustinians among 205 Martyrs of Japan
 3 October: Blessed Angelo Scarpetti
 5 October: Blessed Sante da Cori
 9 October: Blessed Antonio Patrizi and the Blessed of Lecceto
 10 October: Saint Thomas of Villanova
 11 October: Blessed Mateo Elías Nieves Castillo
 12 October: Blessed Maria Giovanna Fasce
 14 October: Blessed Gonçalo de Lagos
 20 October: Saint Magdalene of Nagasaki
 23 October: Saint William of Maleval
 23 October: Blessed John Good
 25 October: Saint John Stone
 29 October: Blessed Peter Gubbio
 31 October: Blessed James of Cerqueto
 7 November: Blessed Grazia da Cattaro
 8 November: Blessed Avelino Rodríguez and 498 Spanish Martyrs
 13 November: All Saints of Order of Saint Augustine
 29 November: Blessed Friedrich von Regensburg
 16 December: Blessed Cherubino Testa

Benedictines
According to the Calendar of the Benedictine Confederation (additional feasts may vary among congregations, or even among monasteries within a same congregation):
 10 January: Saint Gregory of Nyssa, bishop – Optional Memorial 
 15 January: Saint Maurus and Saint Placid, disciples of our Holy Father Benedict – Memorial 
 26 January: Saint Robert, Saint Alberic, and Saint Stephen, abbots of Cîteaux – Optional Memorial 
 10 February:  Saint Scholastica, virgin – Feast 
 11 February: Saint Benedict of Aniane, abbot – Optional Memorial 
 21 February: Saint Peter Damian, bishop and Doctor of the Church – Memorial 
 9 March: Saint Frances of Rome, religious (Benedictine oblate) – Memorial 
 21 March: The Passing of Our Holy Father Benedict, abbot – Feast 
 21 April: Saint Anselm, bishop and Doctor of the Church – Memorial 
 23 April: Saint Adalbert, bishop and martyr – Optional Memorial
 11 May:  Saint Odo, Saint Majolus, Saint Odilo, Saint Hugh and Blessed Peter the Venerable, abbots of Cluny – Memorial 
 15 May: Saint Pachomius, abbot – Optional Memorial 
 19 May: Saint Celestine, pope and hermit – Optional Memorial 
 25 May: Saint Bede the Venerable, priest and Doctor of the Church – Memorial
 27 May: Saint Augustine of Canterbury, bishop – Optional Memorial 
 19 June: Saint Romuald, abbot – Memorial 
 11 July: Our Holy Father Benedict, abbot – Solemnity 
 12 July: Saint John Gualbert, abbot – Optional Memorial 
 13 July: Saint Henry, Benedictine oblate – Optional Memorial 
 29 July: Saint Martha, Saint Mary and Saint Lazarus, hosts of the Lord – Memorial 
 19 August: Saint Bernard Tolomei, abbot – Optional Memorial 
 20 August: Saint Bernard of Clairvaux, abbot and doctor of the Church – Memorial
 3 September: Saint Gregory the Great, pope and Doctor of the Church – Feast
 17 September: Saint Hildegard, virgin and doctor of the Church – Optional Memorial 
 6 October: Saint Bruno, priest and hermit – Memorial
 7 November: Saint Willibrord, bishop – Optional Memorial 
 11 November: Saint Martin of Tours, bishop – Feast
 12 November: Saint Theodore the Studite, abbot – Optional Memorial 
 13 November: All Saints of the Order of Saint Benedict – Feast (in some monasteries)
 14 November: Commemoration of All Deceased Benedictines (in some monasteries)
 16 November: Saint Gertrude the Great, virgin – Memorial
 19 November: Saint Mechtild, virgin – Optional Memorial 
 24 November: Saint Columban, abbot – Optional Memorial 
 26 November: Saint Silvester, abbot – Optional Memorial 
 5 December: Saint Saba, abbot – Optional Memorial

Brothers Hospitallers
20 January: Conversion of Saint John of God – Memorial
12 February: Blessed José Olallo Valdés, religious – Optional Memorial
8 March: Saint John of God, religious and founder – Solemnity
24 April: Saint Benedict Menni, priest – Memorial
26 April: Our Lady of Good Counsel – Optional Memorial
1 May: Saint Richard Pampuri, religious – Memorial
3 June: Saint Juan Grande Román, religious – Memorial
10 June: Blessed Joseph Kugler, religious – Optional Memorial
28 August: Saint Augustine of Hippo, bishop and doctor of the Church – Feast
25 October: Blessed Braulio María Corres and companions, (martyrs – Memorial
5 November: Commemoration of the Faithful Departed of the Order
17 November: Patronage of Our Lady over the Hospitaller Order – Solemnity
28 November: Translation of the Relics of Saint John of God – Optional Memorial

Brothers of the Christian Schools (Lasallians)
 26 January: Translation of the relics of Jean-Baptiste de La Salle – Optional Memorial
 27 January: Saints Timothy and Titus, bishops – Memorial
 30 January: Saint Mutien-Marie Wiaux, religious – Memorial
 9 February: Saint Miguel Febres Cordero – Memorial
 26 April: Our Lady of Good Counsel – Memorial
 27 April: Blessed Nicolas Roland, priest – Optional Memorial
 8 May: Our Lady of the Star – Feast
 15 May: Saint Jean-Baptiste de La Salle, priest and founder – Solemnity
 19 May: Blessed Raphaël Rafiringa, religious – Optional Memorial
 13 August: Saint Benildus Romançon, religious – Memorial
 2 September: Saint Salomone Leclercq, Blessed Roger Faverge, and companion Rochefort martyrs – Optional Memorial
 27 September: Blessed Jean-Bernard Rousseau, religious – Optional Memorial
 9 October: Saint Cirilo Bertrán, Saint Jaime Hilario Barbal, and companion martyrs – Memorial
 21 October: Blessed Nicolas Barré, priest – Optional Memorial
 23 October: Blessed Arnould Rèche, religious – Optional Memorial
 6 November: Blessed  and companion 498 Spanish Martyrs – Memorial
 17 November – Dedication of the Church of Saint John Baptist de la Salle (at the Generalate in Rome) – Optional Memorial

Camillians
10 May: Blessed Enrico Rebuschini, priest – Memorial
22 May: Blessed Maria Domenica Brun Barbantini, religious – Optional Memorial
14 July: Saint Camillus de Lellis, priest and founder – Solemnity
26 September: Blessed Luigi Tezza, priest – Memorial
16 October: Blessed Giuseppina Vannini, virgin – Optional Memorial
25 October or the Sunday before the Solemnity of All Saints: Dedication of the Church (if the date is unknown) – Solemnity
16 November: Our Lady, Health of the Sick – Feast

Capuchins
Besides the celebrations listed in the Common Franciscan Calendar, the Capuchin Proper Calendar is as follows:

 5 January: Blessed Diego José of Cádiz, religious – Optional Memorial (6 Jan. in the USA)
 12 January: Saint Bernard of Corleone, religious – Memorial
 4 February: Saint Joseph of Leonessa, priest – Memorial
 9 February: Blessed Leopold of Alpandeire, religious – Optional Memorial
 21 April: Saint Conrad of Parzham, religious – Memorial
 24 April: Saint Fidelis of Sigmaringen, priest – Feast
 30 April: Blessed Benedict of Urbino, priest – Optional Memorial
 8 May: Blessed Jeremiah of Walachia, religious – Optional Memorial
 11 May: Saint Ignatius of Làconi, religious – Memorial
 12 May: Saint Leopold Mandić, priest – Memorial
 18 May: Saint Felix of Cantalice, religious – Feast
 19 May: Saint Crispin of Viterbo, religious – Memorial
 27 May: Blessed José Tous y Soler, priest – Optional Memorial
 2 June: Saint Felix of Nicosia, religious – Memorial
 8 June: Blessed Nicholas of Gèsturi, religious – Optional Memorial
 12 June: Blessed Florida Cevoli, nun – Optional Memorial
 16 June: Blessed Anazet Koplinski and Companions, martyrs – Optional Memorial
 26 June: Blessed Andrew Hyacinth Longhin, bishop – Optional Memorial
 26 June: Blessed Yaccoub el-Haddad of Ghazir, priest – Optional Memorial
 10 July: Saint Veronica Giuliani, nun – Feast
 21 July: Saint Lawrence of Brindisi, priest and Doctor of the Church – Feast
 27 July: Blessed Mary Magdalen Martinengo, nun – Optional Memorial
 28 July: Blessed Mary Teresa Kowalska, nun and martyr – Optional Memorial
 30 July: Blessed Solanus Casey, priest – Optional Memorial
 7 August: Blesseds Agathangelo and Cassian, priests, martyrs – Optional Memorial
 13 August: Blessed Mark of Aviano, priest – Optional Memorial
 18 August: Blessed Capuchin Martyrs of Rochefort, priests, martyrs – Optional Memorial
 23 August: Blessed Bernard of Offida, religious – Optional Memorial
 2 September: Blessed Apollinaris of Posat, priest, martyr – Optional Memorial
 19 September: Saint Francis Mary of Camporosso, religious – Memorial
 22 September: Saint Ignatius of Santhià, priest – Memorial
 23 September: Saint Pio of Pietrelcina (Padre Pio), priest – Solemnity
 26 September: Blessed Aurelio of Vinalesa and Companions, martyrs – Optional Memorial
 28 September: Blessed Innocent of Berzo, priest – Optional Memorial
 12 October: Saint Seraphin of Montegranaro, religious – Memorial
 13 October: Blessed Honorat Kożmiński, priest – Optional Memorial
 25 October: Blessed María Jesús Masiá Ferragut and Companions, martyrs – Optional Memorial
 31 October: Saint Angelo of Acri, priest – Memorial
 6 November: Blessed Andrew of Palazuelo and Companions, martyrs – Optional Memorial
 2 December: Blessed Mary Angela Astorch, nun – Optional Memorial
 10 December. Blessed Arsenio of Trigolo, priest – Optional Memorial

Carmelites
3 January: Saint Kuriakose Elias Chavara, priest – Optional Memorial
8 January: Saint Peter Thomas, bishop – Feast
9 January: Saint Andrew Corsini, bishop – Feast
20 January: Blessed Angelo Paoli, priest – Optional Memorial
29 January: Blessed Arcangela Girlani, virgin – Optional Memorial
1 February: Blessed Candelaria of Saint Joseph, virgin – Optional Memorial
20 March: Blessed Francisco Palau y Quer, priest – Optional Memorial
17 April: Blessed Battista Spagnoli, priest – Memorial
4 May: Blesseds Angel Prat i Hostench, Luke of Saint Joseph, Tristany Pujoi and companions, priests and martyrs – Optional Memorial
5 May: Saint Angelus, priest and martyr – Memorial
8 May: Blessed Aloysius Rabatà, priest and martyr – Optional Memorial
9 May: Saint George Preca, priest – Memorial
16 May: Saint Simon Stock, religious – Memorial
22 May: Saint Joaquina Vedruna, religious – Optional Memorial
25 May: Saint Mary Magdalene de' Pazzi, virgin – Feast
12 June: Blessed Hilary Januszewski, priest and martyr – Optional Memorial
14 June: Saint Elisha, prophet – Memorial
4 July: Blessed Maria Crocifissa Curcio, virgin – Optional Memorial
9 July: Blessed Jane Scopelli, virgin – Optional Memorial 
13 July: Saint Teresa of Jesus of the Andes, virgin – Optional Memorial
16 July: Solemn Commemoration of the Blessed Virgin Mary of Mount Carmel, Patroness of the Order – Solemnity
17 July: Blessed Teresa of Saint Augustine and companions, virgins and martyrs – Memorial
20 July: Saint Elijah, prophet and founder – Solemnity
24 July: Blessed John Soreth, priest – Optional Memorial
26 July: Saints Joachim and Anne, parents of the Virgin Mary and Protectors of the Order – Memorial
27 July: Blessed Titus Brandsma, priest and martyr – Optional Memorial
7 August: Saint Albert of Trapani, priest – Feast
9 August: Saint Teresa Benedicta of the Cross, virgin and martyr – Feast
12 August: Blessed Isidore Bakanja, martyr – Optional Memorial
17 August: Blessed Angelus Augustine Mazzinghi, priest – Optional Memorial
18 August: Blesseds Jean-Baptiste Duverneueil, Michael Louis Brulard and James Gagnot, priests and martyrs – Memorial
25 August: Saint Mary of Jesus Crucified, virgin – Memorial
26 August: Blessed Jacques Retouret, priest and martyr – Optional Memorial
1 September: Saint Teresa Margaret Redi, virgin – Optional Memorial
17 September: Saint Albert of Jerusalem, bishop and lawgiver of Carmel – Feast
1 October: Saint Therese of the Child Jesus, virgin and doctor of the Church – Feast
15 October: Saint Teresa of Avila, virgin and doctor of the church – Feast
6 November: Saint Nuno of Saint Mary, religious – Memorial
8 November: Saint Elizabeth of the Trinity, virgin – Memorial
13 November: Blessed Maria Teresa Scrilli, virgin – Optional Memorial
14 November: All the Saints of the Carmelite Order – Feast
15 November: Commemoration of all the Faithful Departed of the Order
19 November: Saint Raphael Kalinowski, priest – Memorial
29 November: Blesseds Denis of the Nativity and Redemptus of the Cross, martyrs – Memorial
5 December: Blessed Bartholomew Fanti, priest – Optional Memorial
14 December: Saint John of the Cross, priest, and doctor of the Church – Feast

Carthusians
According to the Proper Rite and Calendar of the Carthusian Order approved on 30 November 2018:
 3 January: Blessed Ayrald, monk and bishop – Optional Memorial
 14 January: Blessed Odo, monk and bishop – Optional Memorial
 4 February: Blessed Lanuin, monk – Optional Memorial
 22 April: Saint Hugh of Grenoble, bishop
4 May: Saints John, Augustine, Robert and Blessed Companions, monks and martyrs
 10 May: Blessed Nicholas Albergati, monk and bishop – Optional Memorial 
 24 May: Blessed William of Fenol, monk
 25 June: Blessed John of Spain, monk
 26 June: Saint Anthelm, monk and bishop
 6 July: Saint Rosaline, virgin and nun
 14 July: Blessed Boniface, monk and bishop – Optional Memorial 
16 July: Blessed Claudius and Lazarus, and other Carthusian Martyrs
 5 August: Blessed William Horn, monk and martyr
 7 September: Saint Stephen, monk and Bishop – Optional Memorial
 6 October: Saint Bruno, monk – Solemnity 
 8 October: Saint Artold, monk and bishop – Optional Memorial 
 13 November: All the saints of the Carthusian Order, monks and nuns
 14 November: The Departed Members of the Carthusian Order
 17 November: Saint Hugh of Lincoln, monk and bishop
 25 November: Blessed Beatrice, virgin and nun

Cistercians
According to the Proper Masses and Calendar of the Cistercian Order:

 10 January: Saint Gregory of Nyssa, bishop; or Saint William of Bourges, bishop – Optional Memorial
 12 January: Saint Aelred of Rievaulx, abbot – Memorial 
 15 January: Saint Maurus and Saint Placid, disciples of our Holy Father Benedict – Memorial 
 26 January: Saint Robert, Saint Alberic, and Saint Stephen, abbots of Cîteaux and founders of the Cistercian Order – Solemnity
 30 January: Commemoration of the Deceased Superiors of the Order
 1 February: Saint Raymond of Fitero, abbot – Optional Memorial 
 10 February:  Saint Scholastica, virgin – Memorial (Feast for nuns) 
 11 February: Saint Benedict of Aniane, abbot – Optional Memorial 
 12 February: Blessed Humbeline, nun – Optional Memorial 
 16 February: Saint Peter de Castelnau, monk and martyr – Optional Memorial 
 21 February: Saint Peter Damian, bishop and Doctor of the Church – Memorial
 8 March: Saint Stephen of Obazine, abbot – Optional Memorial 
 21 March: The Passing of Our Holy Father Benedict, abbot – Feast
 21 April: Saint Anselm, bishop and Doctor of the Church – Memorial
 22 April: Blessed Maria Gabriella Sagheddu, virgin – Optional Memorial
 24 April: Saint Franca, virgin – Optional Memorial
 11 May:  Saint Odo, Saint Majolus, Saint Odilo, Saint Hugh and Blessed Peter the Venerable, abbots of Cluny – Memorial 
 15 May: Saint Pachomius, abbot – Memorial 
 19 May: Saint Celestine, pope and hermit – Optional Memorial 
 25 May: Saint Bede the Venerable, priest and Doctor of the Church – Memorial
 12 June: Saint Aleydis, virgin – Optional Memorial
 14 June: Blessed Gerard of Clairvaux, monk – Optional Memorial
 16 June: Saint Lutgardis, virgin – Memorial
 20 June: Commemoration of Deceased Parents and Brethren of the Cistercian Order
 8 July: Blessed Eugene III, pope – Memorial
 11 July: Our Holy Father Benedict, abbot – Solemnity 
 12 July: Saint John Gualbert, abbot – Optional Memorial 
 13 July: Saint Henry, Benedictine oblate – Optional Memorial 
 16 July: Blessed Virgin Martyrs of Orange – Optional Memorial 
 29 July: Saint Martha, Saint Mary and Saint Lazarus, hosts of the Lord – Memorial 
 19 August: Saint Guerric of Igny, abbot – Memorial 
 20 August: Our Holy Father Bernard, abbot and doctor of the Church – Solemnity
 30 August: Saints Guarinus and Amadeus, bishops – Optional Mamorial
 10 September: Blessed Oglerius, abbot – Optional Memorial
 12 September: Saint Peter of Tarentaise, bishop – Optional Memorial
 17 September: Saint Martin de Finojosa, bishop; or Saint Hildegard, virgin and doctor of the Church – Optional Memorial 
 18 September: Commemoration of Deceased Parents, Relatives, Friends, and Benefactors of the Cistercian Order who died within the year
 6 October: Saint Bruno, priest – Memorial
 9 October: Blessed Vincent Kadlubek, bishop – Optional Memorial
 25 October: Saint Bernard Calbó, bishop – Optional Memorial
 7 November: Saint Willibrord, bishop – Optional Memorial 
 11 November: Saint Martin of Tours, bishop – Feast
 12 November: Saint Theodore the Studite, abbot – Optional Memorial 
 13 November: All Saints under the Rule of Saint Benedict – Feast
 14 November: Commemoration of All Deceased Monastics under the Rule of Saint Benedict
 16 November: Saint Gertrude the Great, virgin – Memorial (may be celebrated as a Feast for nuns)
 19 November: Saint Mechtild, virgin – Optional Memorial 
 24 November: Saint Columban, abbot – Optional Memorial 
 26 November: Saint Silvester, abbot – Optional Memorial 
 5 December: Saint Saba, abbot – Optional Memorial
 11 December: Blessed David, monk – Optional Memorial

Claretians
 22 May: Saint Joaquina Vedruna, religious – Memorial
 Saturday following the second Sunday after Pentecost: Immaculate Heart of Mary, Patroness of the Congregation – Solemnity
 15 June: Saint María Micaela of the Blessed Sacrament, virgin – Memorial
 16 July: Our Lady of Mount Carmel – Feast
 13 August: Blessed Felipe de Jésus Muñárriz, priest and companions, martyrs – Memorial
 13 October: Blessed José María Ruiz Cano and companions, martyrs – Memorial
 24 October: Saint Anthony Mary Claret, bishop – Solemnity
 5 November: Commemoration of the Departed of the Congregations, family and benefactors
 13 November: Blessed Patrocinio Giner Gomis, martyr – Memorial

Discalced Carmelites
3 January: Saint Kuriakose Elias Chavara, priest – Optional Memorial
8 January: Saint Peter Thomas, bishop – Optional Memorial
9 January: Saint Andrew Corsini, bishop – Optional Memorial
1 April: Saint Nuno of Saint Mary, religious – Optional Memorial
17 April: Blessed Battista Spagnoli, priest – Optional Memorial
18 April: Blessed Mary of the Incarnation, religious – Optional Memorial
16 May: Saint Simon Stock, religious – Optional Memorial
22 May: Saint Joaquina Vedruna, religious – Optional Memorial
25 May: Saint Mary Magdalene de' Pazzi, virgin – Memorial
7 June: Blessed Anne of Saint Bartholomew, virgin – Memorial
13 July: Saint Teresa of Jesus of the Andes, virgin – Optional Memorial
16 July: Our Lady of Mount Carmel, Patroness of the Order – Solemnity
17 July: Blessed Teresa of Saint Augustine and companions, virgins and martyrs – Memorial
20 July: Saint Elijah, prophet – Feast
23 July: Our Lady, Mother of Divine Grace – Memorial
24 July: Blesseds María Pilar, Teresa and María Angeles, virgins and martyrs – Optional Memorial
24 July: Blessed John Soreth, priest – Optional Memorial
27 July: Blessed Titus Brandsma, priest and martyr – Optional Memorial
7 August: Saint Albert of Trapani, priest – Memorial
9 August: Saint Teresa Benedicta of the Cross, virgin and martyr – Optional Memorial
25 August: Saint Mary of Jesus Crucified, virgin – Optional Memorial
26 August: Transverberation of Saint Teresa of Avila – Memorial (for Nuns), Optional Memorial for others
1 September: Saint Teresa Margaret Redi, virgin – Memorial
12 September: Blessed Mary of Jesus, virgin – Memorial
17 September: Saint Albert of Jerusalem, bishop and lawgiver of Carmel – Feast
1 October: Saint Therese of the Child Jesus, virgin and doctor of the Church – Feast
15 October: Saint Teresa of Avila, virgin, foundress and doctor of the church – Solemnity
6 November: Blessed Josefa Naval Girbés, virgin – Optional Memorial
7 November: Blessed Francisco Palau y Quer, priest – Optional Memorial
8 November: Saint Elizabeth of the Trinity, virgin – Memorial
14 November: All the Saints of the Order of the Discalced Carmelites – Feast
15 November: Commemoration of all the Faithful Departed of the Order
19 November: Saint Raphael Kalinowski, priest – Memorial
29 November: Blesseds Denis of the Nativity and Redemptus of the Cross, martyrs – Memorial
14 December: Saint John of the Cross, priest, founder and doctor of the Church – Solemnity
16 December: Blessed Mary of the Angels, virgin – Optional Memorial

Dominicans

 3 January: Most Holy Name of Jesus – Optional Memorial 
 4 January: Saint Zdislava Berka of Lemberk, lay Dominican and mother – Optional Memorial
 7 January: Saint Ramon de Penyafort, friar and master of the order – Memorial
 18 January: Saint Margaret of Hungary, nun and virgin – Optional Memorial
 28 January: Saint Thomas Aquinas, friar and doctor of the Church – Feast
 4 February: Saint Caterina de' Ricci, sister and virgin – Optional Memorial
 7 February: Anniversary of Deceased Fathers and Mothers 
 12 February: Blessed Reginald of Orléans, friar – Optional Memorial
 13 February: Blessed Jordan von Sachsen, friar and master of the order – Memorial
 18 February: Blessed Angelico (Giovanni da Fiesole), friar – Optional Memorial
 20 April: Saint Agnese di Montepulciano, nun and virgin – Memorial
 28 April: Saint Louis-Marie Grignion de Montfort, priest and Dominican tertiary – Optional Memorial
 29 April: Saint Caterina da Siena, lay Dominican, virgin, and Doctor of the Church – Feast
 30 April: Pope Saint Pius V, friar – Memorial
 5 May: Saint Vicent Ferrer, friar – Memorial
 10 May: Saint Antonino Pierozzi da Firenze, friar and bishop – Optional Memorial
 19 May: Saint Francesc Coll i Guitart, friar – Optional Memorial
 20 May: Blessed Hyacinthe-Marie Cormier, friar and master of the order – Optional Memorial
 24 May: Translation of the Relics of Our Holy Father Dominic – Memorial
 4 June: Saint Pietro da Verona, friar and martyr – Memorial
 8 June: Blessed Diana degli Andalò and Blessed Cecilia Cesarini and Amata, nuns and virgins – Optional Memorial
 10 June: Blessed Giovanni Dominici, friar and bishop – Optional Memorial
 4 July: Blessed Pier Giorgio Frassati, lay Dominican – Optional Memorial
 9 July: Saint Joannes van Hoornaar, friar and martyr, and Companions, martyrs – Optional Memorial
 9 July: Saint Francisco Fernández de Capillas, friar and martyr, Saint Pere Sans i Jordá, friar, bishop, and martyr, and Companions, martyrs in China – Optional Memorial
 17 July: Blessed Czesław Odrowąż, friar – Optional Memorial
 22 July: Saint Mary Magdalene, patroness of the Order – Feast
 2 August: Blessed Juana Garcés de Aza, mother of Saint Dominic – Optional Memorial
 8 August: Our Holy Father, Saint Dominic, friar, founder of the Order – Solemnity
 17 August: Saint Jacek Hiacynt Odrowąż, friar – Memorial
 18 August: Blessed Mannes (or Mames), friar and brother of Saint Dominic – Optional Memorial 
 23 August: Saint Rosa de Lima, lay Dominican and virgin – Memorial
 28 August: Saint Augustinus Hipponensis, bishop and Doctor of the Church – Feast
 5 September: Anniversary of Deceased Friends and Benefactors
 18 September: Saint Juan Macías, friar – Optional Memorial
 28 September: Saint Domingo Ibáñez de Erquicia, friar and martyr, Saint Jacobo Kyushei Gorobioye Tomonaga de Santa María, friar and martyr, Saint Lorenzo Ruiz ng Maynila, lay Dominican, husband, and protomartyr of the Philippines, and Companions, martyrs in Japan – Optional Memorial
 28 September: or Blessed Alphonsus Navarrete, friar – Optional Memorials
 4 October: Our Holy Father, Saint Francis of Assisi, deacon – Feast
 5 October: Blessed Raimondo da Capua delle Vigne, friar and Master of the Order – Optional Memorial
 7 October: Blessed Virgin Mary of the Holy Rosary (Our Lady of Victory) – Feast
 9 October: Saint Lluís Bertran, friar – Memorial
 3 November: Saint Martín de Porres Velázquez, lay brother – Feast
 6 November: Blessed Buenaventura García de Paredes, friar, master of the Order, and martyr and Jacinto Serrano Lopez, martyr, and companions, martyrs – Optional Memorial
 7 November: All Saints of the Order of Preachers – Feast 
 8 November: Anniversary of Deceased Brothers and Sisters 
 15 November: Saint Albertus Magnus, friar, bishop and Doctor of the Church – Feast
 24 November: Saint Ignatius Delgado y Cebrian, friar, bishop, and martyr, Saint Vinh Sơn Phạm Hiếu Liêm, friar and martyr, Saint Dominic An-Kham Viet Pham, lay Dominican, father, and martyr, and companions, martyrs in Vietnam – Memorial
 22 December: Anniversary of the Approval of the Order

Franciscans
Note: Saints in the Franciscan Order are classified into First Order (members of male congregations such as the Order of Friars Minor, as well as the Conventual and Capuchin Franciscans), Second Order (cloistered female congregations, such as the Poor Clares), and Third Order (lay associates and other religious congregations that follow the Franciscan charism).

 3 January: The Most Holy Name of Jesus – Memorial
 4 January: Saint Angela of Foligno, religious, III Order – Optional Memorial
 14 January: Blessed Odoric of Pordenone, priest, I Order – Memorial
 16 January: Saints Berard of Carbio and Companions, protomartyrs of the Order – Memorial
 12 January: Saint Bernard of Corleone, religious, I Order – Optional Memorial
 27 January: Saint Angela Merici, virgin, III Order – Optional Memorial 
 6 February: Saint Pedro Bautista, Paul Miki and Companions, martyrs, I and III Order – Memorial
 7 February: Saint Colette of Corbie, virgin, II Order – Optional Memorial 
 21 April: Saint Conrad of Parzham, religious, I Order – Memorial
 23 April: Saint Giles (Aegidius) of Assisi, religious, I Order – Optional Memorial
 24 April: Saint Fidelis of Sigmaringen, priest and martyr, I Order – Feast
 24 April: Saint Peter of Saint Joseph de Betancur, missionary – Memorial
 28 April: Blessed Luchesius Modestini, III Order – Optional Memorial
 11 May: Saint Ignatius of Laconi, religious, I Order – Optional Memorial
 16 May: Saint Margaret of Cortona, III Order – Memorial
 17 May: Saint Paschal Baylon, religious, I Order – Memorial
 18 May: Saint Felix of Cantalice, religious, I Order – Feast
 20 May: Saint Bernardine of Siena, priest, I Order – Feast
 24 May: Dedication of the Basilica of Our Holy Father Francis – Feast
 28 May: Saint Mariana de Jesús de Paredes, virgin, III Order – Optional Memorial
 13 June: Saint Anthony of Padua, priest and Doctor of the Church, I Order – Feast
 30 June: Saint Raymond Llull, martyr, III Order – Optional Memorial
 4 July: Saint Elizabeth of Portugal, III Order – Optional Memorial
 8 July: Saint Gregory Grassi, bishop, and Companions, martyrs, I and III Order – Optional Memorial
 9 July: Saint Nicholas Pieck, priest, and companions, martyrs, I Order – Optional Memorial
 10 July: Saint Veronica Giuliani, virgin, II Order – Memorial
 12 July: Saint John Jones and John Wall, priests and martyrs, I Order – Optional Memorial
 14 July: Saint Francis Solano, priest, I Order – Optional Memorial
 15 July: Saint Bonaventure, bishop and Doctor of the Church, I Order – Feast
 21 July: Saint Lawrence of Brindisi, priest and Doctor of the Church, I Order – Feast
 23 July: Saint Bridget of Sweden, religious, III Order – Optional Memorial
 2 August: Our Lady of the Angels of the Portiuncula – Feast
 7 August Blessed  and Blessed , priests and martyrs, I Order – Optional Memorial
 8 August: Saint Dominic de Guzman, priest, founder of the Dominican Order – Feast
 11 August: Saint Clare of Assisi, virgin, II Order – Feast
 14 August: Saint Maximilian Kolbe, priest and martyr, I Order – Memorial
 19 August: Saint Louis of Toulouse, bishop, I Order – Memorial
 25 August: Saint Louis IX of France, king, Patron of the III Order – Memorial
 2 September Blessed , Blessed , and Companions, martyrs, I and III Orders – Optional Memorial
 4 September Saint Rose of Viterbo, virgin, III Order – Optional Memorial
 17 September: Receiving of the Stigmata of Our Holy Father Francis – Feast
 18 September: Saint Joseph of Cupertino, priest, I Order – Feast
 20 September: Saint Francis Mary of Camporosso, religious, I Order – Memorial
 4 October: Our Holy Father Francis of Assisi, deacon, founder of the Three Orders – Solemnity
 10 October Saint Daniel, priest, and Companions, martyrs, I Order – Optional Memorial
 12 October: Saint Seraphin of Montegranaro, religious, I Order – Optional Memorial
 19 October: Saint Peter of Alcantara, priest, I Order – Memorial
 20 October: Blessed James of Strepar, bishop, I Order – Optional Memorial
 23 October: Saint John of Capistrano, priest, I Order – Memorial
 26 October: Blessed , priest, I Order – Optional Memorial
 30 October: Anniversary of Dedication in Consecrated Churches of the Order – Solemnity
 4 November: Saint Charles Borromeo, bishop, Protector of the Friars Minor – Optional Memorial
 13 November: Saint Didacus of Alcala, religious, I Order – Optional Memorial
 14 November: Saint Nicholas Tavelic and Companions, martyrs, I Order – Memorial
 17 November: Saint Elizabeth of Hungary, Patroness of the III Order – Feast
 19 November: Saint Agnes of Assisi, virgin, II Order – Feast
 26 November: Saint Leonard of Port Maurice, priest, I Order – Memorial
 27 November: Blessed Francis Anthony Fasani, priest, I Order – Optional Memorial
 28 November: Saint James of the Marches, priest, I Order – Memorial
 29 November: All Saints of the Seraphic Order – Feast

Jesuits
 3 January: Most Holy Name of Jesus, Titular Feast of the Society of Jesus – Solemnity
 19 January: Saints John Ogilvie, priest; Stephen Pongrácz, Melchior Grodiziecki, priests and Mark of Krizevci; Blessed Inácio de Azevedo, priest and companions; James Salès, priest and William Saultemouche, religious, martyrs – Optional Memorial
 4 February: Saints John de Britto, priest; Blessed Rodolfo Acquaviva, priest and companions, martyrs – Optional Memorial
 6 February: Saints Paul Miki, religious and companions; Blessed Charles Spinola, Sebastian Kimura, priests and companions, martyrs – Memorial
 15 February: Saint Claude de la Colombière, priest – Memorial
 19 March: Saint Joseph, Spouse of the Blessed Virgin Mary, Patron of the Society of Jesus – Solemnity
 22 April: Mary, Mother of the Society of Jesus – Feast
 27 April: Saint Peter Canisius, priest and doctor of the Church – Memorial
 4 May: Saint José María Rubio, priest – Optional Memorial
 16 May: Saint Andrew Bobola, priest and martyr – Optional Memorial
 24 May: Our Lady of the Way – Optional Memorial
 8 June: Saint James Berthieu, priest and martyr – Memorial
 9 June: Saint José de Anchieta, priest – Optional Memorial
 21 June: Saint Aloysius Gonzaga, religious – Memorial
 2 July: Saints Bernardine Realino, John Francis Régis and Francis Jerome; Blesseds Julian Maunoir and Anthony Baldinucci, priests – Optional Memorial
 9 July: Saints Leo Ignatius Mangin, priest, Mary Zhu Wu and companions, martyrs – Memorial
 31 July: Saint Ignatius of Loyola, priest and founder of the Congregation – Solemnity
 2 August: Saint Peter Faber, priest – Optional Memorial
 18 August: Saint Alberto Hurtado, priest – Memorial
 2 September: Blessed James Bonnaud, priest and companions; Joseph Imbert and John Nicolas Cordier, priest; Thomas Sitjar, priest and companions, martyrs – Optional Memorial
 9 September: Saint Peter Claver, priest – Memorial
 10 September: Blessed Francisco Gárate, religious – Optional Memorial
 17 September: Saint Robert Bellarmine, bishop and doctor of the Church – Memorial
 3 October: Saint Francis Borgia, priest – Memorial
 12 October: Blessed John Beyzym, priest – Memorial
 19 October: Saints Jean de Brébeuf, Isaac Jogues, priests and companions, martyrs – Memorial
 21 October: Blessed Diego Luis de San Vitores, priest and Saint Pedro Calungsod, martyrs – Optional Memorial
 30 October: Blessed Dominic Collins, religious – Optional Memorial
 31 October: Saint Alphonsus Rodriguez, religious – Memorial
 3 November: Blessed Rupert Mayer, priest – Optional Memorial
 5 November: All Saints of the Society of Jesus – Feast
 6 November: The Commemoration of All the Departed of the Society of Jesus
 13 November: Saint Stanislaus Kostka, religious – Memorial
 14 November: Saint Joseph Pignatelli, priest – Memorial
 16 November: Saints Roque González, Alfonso Rodríguez, and Juan del Castillo, priests and martyrs – Optional Memorial
 23 November: Blessed Miguel Pro, priest and martyr – Optional Memorial
 26 November: Saint John Berchmans, religious – Memorial
 29 November: Blessed Bernardo Francisco de Hoyos de Seña, priest – Optional Memorial
 1 December: Saints Edmund Campion, Robert Southwell, priests and companions, martyrs – Memorial
 3 December: Saint Francis Xavier, priest – Feast

Mercedarians
17 April: Blessed Marianna of Jesus Navarro, virgin – Memorial
27 April: Saint Peter Armengol, religious and martyr – Memorial
13 May: Saint Peter Nolasco, religious and founder – Solemnity
9 July: Most Holy Redeemer – Feast
28 August: Saint Augustine, bishop and doctor of the Church – Feast
31 August: Saint Raymund Nonnatus, priest – Feast
19 September: Saint Mary of Cervellon, virgin – Memorial (Feast for Nuns)
24 September: Our Lady of Mercy – Solemnity
25 October: Dedication of the Church (if date is unknown) – Solemnity
6 November: All the Saints of the Order – Feast
7 November: Commemoration of All of the Faithful Departed of the Order
14 November: Saint Serapion, religious and martyr – Memorial
6 December: Saint Peter Paschasius, bishop and martyr – Memorial

Missionaries of Charity
 30 April: Saint Joseph Benedict Cottolengo, priest – Memorial
 16 August: Queenship of Blessed Virgin Mary – Memorial
 22 August: Immaculate Heart of Mary, Patroness of the Congregation – Solemnity
 5 September: Saint Teresa of Calcutta, virgin and foundress – Feast

Missionaries of the Precious Blood
 4 February: Saint Maria de Mattias, virgin – Memorial
 12 May: Our Lady, Mother of Mercy – Optional Memorial
 24 May: Our Lady, Help of Christians – Memorial
 1 July: The Most Precious Blood of Our Lord Jesus Christ, Titular Feast of the Congregation – Solemnity
 15 September: Our Lady of Sorrows, Woman of the New Covenant – Memorial
 21 October: Saint Gaspar del Bufalo, priest and founder – Solemnity
 3 December: Saint Francis Xavier, priest; Patron of the Congregation – Feast

Murialdines
 19 March: Saint Joseph, Spouse of the Blessed Virgin Mary, Titular and Principal Patron of the Congregation of St. Joseph – Solemnity
 1 May: Saint Joseph the Worker – Feast
 18 May: Saint Leonardo Murialdo, priest and founder of the congregation – Solemnity

Oratorians
16 January: Saint Joseph Vaz, priest – Optional Memorial
30 January: Blessed Sebastian Valfrè, priest – Memorial
26 May: Saint Philip Neri, priest and founder – Solemnity
30 August: Blessed Juvenal Ancina, bishop – Memorial
5 October: Saint Luigi Scrosoppi, priest – Memorial
9 October: Saint John Henry Newman, priest – Optional Memorial
15 December: Blessed Antonio Grassi, priest – Optional Memorial

Passionists
 5 January: Saint Charles Houben of Mount Argus, priest – Optional Memorial
 27 February: Saint Gabriel of Our Lady of Sorrows, religious – Feast
 Friday before Ash Wednesday: Solemn Commemoration of the Passion of Our Lord Jesus Christ – Solemnity
 Tuesday before Ash Wednesday: Memorial of Our Lord's Agony in the Garden – Memorial
 Second Friday after Easter Sunday: The Glorious Wounds of Our Lord Jesus Christ – Memorial
 16 May: Saint Gemma Galgani, virgin – Memorial
 12 June: Blessed Lawrence Salvi of Saint Francis Xavier, priest – Optional Memorial
 1 July: The Most Precious Blood of Our Lord Jesus Christ – Feast
 6 July: Saint Maria Goretti, virgin and martyr – Memorial
 9 July: Our Lady, Mother of Holy Hope – Optional Memorial
 24 July: Blessed Nicephorous Tejerina and companions, martyrs – Optional Memorial
 26 August: Blessed Dominic of the Mother of God, priest – Memorial
 15 September: Our Lady of Sorrows – Feast
 24 September: Saint Vincent Strambi, bishop – Memorial
 6 October: Blessed Isidore de Loor of Saint Joseph, religious – Optional Memorial
 9 October: Saint Innocencio Canoura of Mary Immaculate, priest and martyr – Optional Memorial
 19 October: Saint Paul of the Cross, priest and founder – Solemnity
 3 November: Blessed Pius Campidelli of Saint Aloysius, religious – Optional Memorial
 5 November: Commemoration of All the Faithful Departed of the Congregation of Passion
 13 November: Blessed Eugene Bossilkov, bishop and martyr – Optional Memorial
 18 November: Blessed Grimoaldo Santamaría of the Purification, religious – Optional Memorial
 9 December: Blessed Bernard Mary of Jesus, priest –  Optional Memorial

Redemptorists
5 January: Saint John Nepomucene Neumann, bishop – Memorial
14 January: Blessed Peter Donders, priest – Optional Memorial
15 March: Saint Clement Mary Hofbauer, religious – Feast
Thursday after the Solemnity of the Sacred Heart: Eucharistic Heart of Jesus – Optional Memorial
27 June: Our Lady of Perpetual Help – Feast
28 June: Blessed Nicholas Charnetsky, bishop and companions, martyrs – Optional Memorial
30 June: Blessed Jenaro Maria Samelli, priest – Memorial
1 August: Saint Alphonsus Mary Liguori, bishop, founder and doctor of the Church – Solemnity
25 August: Blessed Methodius Dominic Trčka, martyr – Optional Memorial
26 September: Blessed Gaspar Stanggsinger, priest – Optional Memorial
5 October: Blessed Francis Xavier Seelos, priest – Optional Memorial
16 October: Saint Gerard Majella, religious – Memorial
7 November: Blessed  and companions, martyrs – Memorial

Pauline Family
 Saturday after the Ascension: Our Lady, Queen of the Apostles – Feast
 30 June: Saint Paul the Apostle, Patron Saint of the Congregation – Solemnity
 3 September: Our Lady, Mother of the Good Shepherd – Memorial
 4 September: Saint Gregory the Great, pope and doctor of the Church – Memorial
 22 October: Blessed Timothy Giaccardo, priest – Memorial
 Last Sunday of October: Jesus, Divine Master – Solemnity
 26 November: Blessed James Alberione, priest and founder – Feast

Piarists
6 February: Saint Dorothy, virgin and martyr – Optional Memorial
26 February: Saint Paula Montal, virgin – Optional Memorial
8 March: Saint Faustino Míguez, priest – Optional Memorial
18 March: Blessed Celestina Donati, virgin – Optional Memorial
8 May: Our Lady, Mother of God of the Pious Schools – Feast
15 July: Saint Pompilio María Pirrotti, priest – Memorial
25 August: Saint Joseph Calasanctius, priest and founder – Solemnity
12 September: Most Holy Name of Mary – Feast
17 September: Blessed Anthony Mary Schwartz, priest – Optional Memorial
19 September: Blessed María Baldillou and companions, martyrs – Optional Memorial (Memorial for Nuns)
22 September: Blessed Dionisio Pamplona, priest and companions, martyrs – Memorial
17 October: Blessed Peter Casani, priest – Memorial
25 October: Dedication of the Church (if date is unknown) – Solemnity
3 November: Commemoration of All the Faithful Departed of the Order
4 November: Commemoration of All the Departed Family, Benefactors of the Order
6 November: Commemoration of All the Departed Priests of the Order
7 November: Commemoration of All the Departed Nuns of the Order
27 November: Patronage of Saint Joseph Calasanctius – Optional Memorial

Society of St. Francis de Sales (Salesian Priests and Sisters)
 8 January: Blessed Titus Zeman, priest and martyr – Memorial
 15 January: Blessed Luigi Variara, priest – Memorial (Optional Memorial for the Daughters of Mary Help of Christians (FMA) and the Volunteers of Don Bosco (VDB))
 22 January: Blessed Laura Vicuña – Optional Memorial (Memorial for FMA)
 24 January: Saint Francis of Sales, bishop and doctor of the Church, Titular of the Congregation – Feast
 30 January: Blessed Bronislaus Markiewicz – Optional Memorial (For the Salesian Priests (SDB) only)
 31 January: Our Holy Father and Founder Saint John Bosco, priest, founder and patron of the Congregation – Solemnity 
 1 February: Commemoration of all deceased Salesian Confreres (For SDB only)
 7 February: Blessed Pius IX, pope – Optional Memorial
 9 February: Blessed Eusebia Palomino Yenes, virgin – Optional Memorial (Memorial for FMA)
 25 February: Saint Luigi Versiglia, bishop and Saint Callistus Caravario, priest, Salesian Protomartyrs – Feast (Memorial for FMA and VDB)
 6 May: Saint Dominic Savio – Feast
 13 May: Saint Mary Domenica Mazzarello, virgin and cofoundress of the congregation – Feast (Solemnity for FMA)
 14 May: Commemoration of Deceased parents of the Daughters of Mary Help of Christians (FMA only)
 15 May: Our Lady of Fatima – Memorial (Optional for FMA and VDB)
 16 May: Saint Louis Orione, priest – Memorial
 18 May: Saint Leonardo Murialdo, priest – Optional Memorial
 24 May: Mary, Help of Christians, Principal Patroness of the Salesian Society of St. Francis de Sales (Salesians of Don Bosco), Principal Patroness and Titular of the Institute of the Daughters of Mary Help of Christians – Solemnity
 25 May: Commemoration of Deceased Daughters of Mary Help of Christians (For FMA only)
 29 May: Blessed Joseph Kowalski, priest and martyr – Memorial (Optional Memorial for FMA and VDB)
 8 June: Blessed István Sándor, martyr – Memorial
 12 June: Blessed Francis Kesy and companions, martyrs – Optional Memorial
 23 June: Saint Joseph Cafasso, priest – Memorial
 7 July: Blessed Maria Romero Meneses, virgin – Optional Memorial (Memorial for FMA)
 2 August: Blessed Augustus Czartoryski, priest – Optional Memorial
 25 August: Blessed Maria Troncatti, virgin – Optional Memorial
 26 August: Blessed Zeferino Namuncura – Optional Memorial
 22 September: Blesseds Joseph Calasanz, Henry Saiz, Enrique Aparicio, priests and companions, martyrs – Memorial (Optional Memorial for VDB)
 5 October: Blessed Alberto Marvelli – Optional Memorial (For SDB only)
 13 October: Blessed Alexandrina da Costa, virgin – Optional Memorial
 15 October: Saint Teresa of Avila, virgin and doctor of the Church, Secondary Patroness of the Daughters of Mary, Help of Christians - Feast (For FMA only)
 24 October: Saint Luigi Guanella, priest – Optional Memorial
 25 October: Dedication of the Church (if date of dedication is unknown) – Solemnity
 27 October: Dedication of the Basilica of Our Lady Help of Christians, Turin – Feast (Solemnity in the Basilica itself)
 29 October: Blessed Michael Rua, priest and first successor of Don Bosco – Memorial
 13 November: Saint Artémides Zatti, religious – Memorial (Optional Memorial for FMA)
 15 November: Blessed Maddalena Caterina Morano, virgin – Optional Memorial
 5 December: Blessed Philip Rinaldi, priest and third successor of Don Bosco – Memorial (Feast for VDB)

Salvatorians
 21 July: Blessed Francis Mary of the Cross Jordan (Francis Mary of the Cross Jordan) - Feast
 5 September: Blessed Mary of the Apostles (Maria Therese von Wüllenweber) – Feast
 11 October: Mary, Mother of the Saviour – Solemnity
 25 December: Solemnity of the Nativity of the Lord - Patronal Feast of the Salvatorians

Servites
12 January: Saint Anthony Mary Pucci, priest – Feast
15 January: Blessed James of Pieve, religious – Optional Memorial
3 February: Blessed Joachim of Sienna – Memorial
17 February: Seven Holy Founders of the Order – Solemnity
19 February: Blessed Elizabeth Picenardi, virgin – Optional Memorial
Friday after the Fifth Sunday of Lent: Our Lady at the Foot of the Cross – Feast
4 May: Saint Peregine Laziosi, religious – Feast
8 May: Our Lady, Mother and Mediatrix of All Graces – Optional Memorial
11 May: Blessed John Benincasa, religious – Optional Memorial
12 May: Blessed Francis of Sienna, priest – Memorial
30 May: Blessed James Bertoni, priest – Memorial
19 June: Saint Juliana Falconieri, virgin – Feast (Solemnity for the Nuns)
27 June: Blessed Thomas of Orvieto, religious – Optional Memorial
1 July: Blessed Ferdinand Baccilieri, religious – Optional Memorial
4 July: Blessed Ubaldus of Borgo Sansepolcro, priest – Optional Memorial
13 July: Saint Clelia Barbieri, virgin – Memorial
23 August: Saint Philip Benizi, religious – Feast
28 August: Saint Augustine, bishop and doctor of the Church – Feast
31 August: Blessed Andrea of Borgo Sansepolcro, religious – Optional Memorial
1 September: Blessed Giovanna of Firenze, virgin – Optional Memorial (Memorial for the Nuns)
5 September: Blessed Maria Maddalena Starace, virgin – Optional Memorial
6 September: Blessed Bonaventure of Forlì, priest – Memorial
15 September: Our Lady of Sorrows, Principal Patroness of the Order – Solemnity
17 September: Blessed Cecilia Eusepi, virgin – Optional Memorial
22 September: Dedication of the Basilica of Monte Senario – Memorial
3 October: Blessed María Guadalupe Ricart Olmos, virgin and martyr – Optional Memorial
25 October: Blessed Giovannangelo Porro – Memorial
16 November: All of Saints of the Order – Feast
17 November: Commemoration of all the Faithful Departed of the Order
10 December: Blessed Jerome of Sant'Angelo in Vado, priest – Optional Memorial
15 December: Blessed Bonaventure of Pistoia, priest – Optional Memorial

Society of the Divine Word
 15 January: Saint Arnold Janssen, priest and founder – Solemnity
 29 January: Saint Joseph Freinademetz, priest – Memorial
 25 March: Annunciation of the Lord, Titular Feast of the Society – Solemnity
 Saturday following the second Sunday after Pentecost: Immaculate Heart of Mary – Feast
 12 June: Blesseds Louis Mzyk, Stanislaus Kubista and Aloysius Liguda, priests and Gregory Frackowak, religious, martyrs – Optional Memorial
 8 September: Birth of the Blessed Virgin Mary, Patroness of the Society – Solemnity
 28 November: Blessed Maria Helena Stollenwerk – Optional Memorial

Theatines
4 January: Saint Giuseppe Maria Tomasi, priest – Feast
8 May: Our Lady, Immaculate Mother – Feast
16 June: Blessed Paolo Burali, bishop – Memorial
7 August: Saint Cajetan, priest and founder – Solemnity
14 September: Exaltation of the Holy Cross – Solemnity
10 November: Saint Andrew Avelino, priest – Feast
12 December: Blessed John Marinonio, priest – Memorial

Trinitarians
 7 January: Saint Juan de Ribera, bishop – Memorial
 22 January: Saint Vincenzo Pallotti, priest – Memorial
 28 January: Saint Agnes Romana, virgin and martyr, Principal Patroness of the Order – Feast
 4 February: Blessed Elisabetta Canori Mora – Memorial
 14 February: Saint Juan Bautista de la Concepción, priest – Feast
 24 March: Blessed Diego José de Cádiz, priest – Memorial
 16 April: Saint Benoît-Joseph Labre, religious – Memorial
 7 May: Translation of the Relics of Saint Jean de Matha – Optional Memorial
 11 May: Blessed Domingo Iturrate Zubero del Santísimo Sacramento, priest – Memorial
 Sunday following Pentecost: Most Holy Trinity, Titular of the Order – Solemnity
 8 June: Saint Miquel Argemir i Mitjà dels Sants, priest – Feast
 9 June: Blessed Anna Maria Giannetti Taigi – Memorial
 12 August: Pope Blessed Innocentius XI, pope – Memorial
 25 August: Saint Louis IX of France – Memorial
 12 September: Most Holy Name of the Blessed Virgin Mary – Memorial
 24 September: Blessed Marcos Criado Guelamo, priest and martyr – Memorial
 28 September: Saint Simón de Rojas, priest – Memorial
 8 October: Our Lady of Good Remedy, Patroness of the Order – Solemnity
 23 October: Most Holy Redeemer – Feast
 4 November: Saint Félix de Valois, priest and co-founder – Memorial
 13 November: All the Saints of the Order of the Most Holy Trinity – Feast
 14 November: Commemoration of all the Faithful Departed of the Order
 17 December: Saint Jean de Matha, priest and founder – Solemnity

Vincentian Family
Includes the Congregation of the Missions and the Daughters of Charity of Saint Vincent de Paul

4 January: Saint Elizabeth Anne Seton, religious – Memorial
7 January: Blessed Lindalva Justo de Oliveira, virgin and martyr – Optional Memorial
25 January: The Conversion of Saint Paul, anniversary of the Institution of the Congregation of Missions – Feast
1 February: Blesseds Marie-Anne Vaillot and Otilia Baumgarten, virgins and martyrs – Optional Memorial
3 February: Blessed Josephine Nicoli, virgin – Optional Memorial
7 February: Blessed Rosalia Rendu, virgin – Optional Memorial
26 April: Translation of the Relics of Saint Vincent de Paul – Optional Memorial
9 May: Saint Louise de Marillac, religious and cofounder – Solemnity
23 May: Saint Joanna Antide Thouret, virgin – Optional Memorial
30 May: Blessed Martha Mary Wiecka, virgin – Optional Memorial
26 June: Blessed Mary Magdalene Fontaine and companions, virgins and martyrs – Optional Memorial
9 July: Saints Francis Regis Clet, Augustine Zhao Rong, priests and companions, martyrs – Memorial
28 July: Saint Peter Chrysologus, bishop and doctor of the Church – Optional Memorial
30 July: Saint Justin de Jacobis, bishop – Memorial
30 August: Blessed Ghebre Michael, priest and martyr —Memorial
2 September: Blesseds Louis Joseph François and companions, priests and martyrs – Optional Memorial
9 September: Blessed Frederic Ozanam – Optional Memorial
11 September: Saint John Gabriel Perboyre, priest and martyr – Memorial
27 September: Saint Vincent de Paul, priest and founder – Solemnity
Sunday before the Solemnity of All Saints: Dedication of the Church (if date is unknown) – Solemnity
6 November: Blesseds Fortunata Velasco Tobar, priest, Melchora Adoración Cortés Bueno, José Martínez Pérez, virgins and companions, martyrs – Optional Memorial
27 November: Our Lady of the Miraculous Medal – Feast
28 November: Saint Catharine Labouré, virgin – Memorial
10 December: Blessed Marco Antonio Durando, priest – Optional Memorial

See also 
 General Roman Calendar
 National calendars of the Roman Rite
 Personal jurisdiction calendars of the Roman Rite

Notes

References 

Liturgical calendars of the Catholic Church